The Kilnap Viaduct (known colloquially as the Eight-Arch Bridge) is an eight-arch railway viaduct located in Cork, Ireland. Built in 1845, it carried the Great Southern & Western Railway line to Cork over the valley of Glennamought River and Mallow Road. The viaduct is listed as a protected structure by the Cork City Council.

Technical details
The eight-arch railway viaduct features rock-faced ashlar limestone piers with a cut stone impost supporting squared coursed limestone spandrels with dressed limestone string course. It has rock-faced limestone voussoirs leading to round-headed arches, ashlar limestone vaults to barrels and a squared coursed limestone parapet with cut stone coping. The viaduct was built by William Dargan.

As built, it was 420 ft long and 90 ft high.

References

See also 

 Cork railway tunnel

Railway bridges in the Republic of Ireland
Bridges completed in 1845
Bridges in County Cork